William MacWilliam O'Brien, 8th Baron of Inchiquin, 3rd Baron O'Brien of Burren, 3rd Earl of Inchiquin PC (1662 – 24 December 1719) was an Irish nobleman.

Life
William O'Brien was the son of William O'Brien, 2nd Earl of Inchiquin and Lady Margaret Boyle. He married his cousin Mary Villiers, daughter of Sir Edward Villiers of Richmond and Frances Howard, the youngest daughter of Theophilus Howard, 2nd Earl of Suffolk and Elizabeth Hume.

Like his father, he was attainted in his absence by the Irish Parliament of King James II in 1689. He was Governor of Kinsale in 1693. He signed the declaration and association in defence of King William III after the assassination attempt against the King in 1697.

He was Privy Councillor to Queen Anne and King George I, Colonel of Foot in 1703 and Mayor of Kilkenny from 1704 to 1705. He was made Governor of County Clare.

Family
Children of William O'Brien, 3rd Earl of Inchiquin and Mary Villiers:
 Donal O'Brien, born 1689.
 William O'Brien, 4th Earl of Inchiquin (1700 – 18 July 1777)
 Mary O'Brien, who married Robert FitzGerald, 19th Earl of Kildare, son of Hon. Robert FitzGerald and Mary Clotworthy, on 7 March 1708/9. They had two sons and one daughter.
 Charles O'Brien Lieut RN
 James O'Brien (d. 17 December 1771) Married Mary Jephson, daughter of Very Revd William Jephson and Anne Barry. They had three sons and two daughters.
 Henrietta O'Brien (d. 1730) Married Robert Sandford in August 1717. They had one daughter.

References
 
 O'Brien genealogy

People from County Clare
17th-century Irish people
18th-century Irish people
1662 births
1719 deaths
Members of the Privy Council of Ireland
William
Earls of Inchiquin